The Göta Life Guards, designated P 1, was a Swedish Army armoured regiment that was active in various forms 1944–1980. The unit was based in the Enköping Garrison in Enköping and belonged to the King's Life and Household Troops (Kungl. Maj:ts Liv- och Hustrupper) until 1974.

Units

Blue Brigade
The Blue Brigade (PB 6) was raised in 1949 and was organized following the Pansarbrigad 49 ("Armoured Brigade 49") unit type. According to the Defence Act of 1972, the brigade was disbanded on 30 June 1980.

In connection with the Defence Act of 1942, infantry regiments came to be raised as "field regiments" and "duplication regiments". The Svea Life Guards raised the war-time units Svea Life Guards (I 1) and Stockholm Infantry Regiment (Stockholms infanteriregemente, I 31). After the Defence Act  of 1948, brigades throughout the entire army were introduced, which led the army to be renamed into two brigade types, infantry brigades and armoured brigades. Stockholm Infantry Regiment (I 31) was reorganized and was responsible for the armoured part of the Blue Brigade (PB 6) and the Södermanland Brigade (PB 10).

Swedish Armoured Troops Cadet and Officer Candidate School
The Swedish Armoured Troops Cadet and Officer Candidate School (PKAS) was co-localized with the regiment. However, the school was directly subordinate to the Inspector of the Swedish Armoured Troops, but was commanded in a barracks point of view by the regiment's executive officer. The school was tasked with training officers candidates from all units within the Swedish Armoured Troops. These underwent two-stage training, first candidate school and second candidate school, then completed their education at the Military Academy Karlberg in Solna. The school was placed to Enköping on 3 April 1946, and was transferred to barracks of the Life company. On 1 March 1967, the school was able to move into a newly built school building within the barracks area. The Life company thus returned to a school company at the Göta Life Guards. Although Göta Life Guards was not provided with the Stridsvagn 103, training of it was still conducted at the school. This was because the school was provided with all types of combat vehicles within the armoured branch. When the regiment was disbanded, the school came to be relocated to Skövde on 1 June 1980, where it was amalgamated with the Swedish Armoured Troops School (PS), who adopted the new name, the Swedish Armoured Troops Combat School (Pansartruppernas stridsskola, PS).

Training companies
The regiment trained eight companies, tank crews, of which two tank destroyer platoons (with Infanterikanonvagn 102 and Infanterikanonvagn 103), a signal company and an assault pioneer company. Future platoon leaders were trained at the 3rd Company, which was a student company. Furthermore, PKAS trained four companies.

Life company – command training company, tank and mechanized infantry
2nd Company – tross company
3rd Company – command training company, assault gun och mechanized infantry
4th Company  – tank company
5th Company  – reconnaissance company
6th Company  – mechanized infantry company
7th Company  – signal company
8th Company  – depot company

Barracks and training areas

Barracks
When the regiment was re-raised, its staff was placed to Karlavägen 78 and later to Linnégatan 89 in Stockholm. On 18 January 1944, the staff was relocated to Enköping, where it was placed in temporary premises. On 15 September 1945, the regiment officially moved to the newly built barracks area in Enköping which was celebrated by a ceremony on 16 September 1945.

Detachments

Strängnäs/Skövde
When the regiment was re-raised, training of conscripts was conducted at Södermanland Regiment (P 3) in Strängnäs Garnison from 18 January 1944, and at Skaraborg Regiment (P 4) in Skövde Garrison. On 15 September 1945, these detachments were disbanded when the training was transferred to Enköping.

Visby
On 1 October 1944, the regiment placed a company to Gotland, which became known as Göta Armoured Life Guards' Company in Gotland (P 1 G). The detachment was placed to the barracks at Gotland Infantry Regiment (I 18). From 1946, the detachment moved into the newly built barracks, Barracks IV (from the 1960s known as the barracks Havde), at Gotland Infantry Regiment. On 30 March 1963, the detachment was disbanded and on 1 April 1963 it was amalgamated with Gotland Regiment (P 18).

Training areas
From 1944 the regiment began training at Utö proving ground, and from 1945 the regiment's proving ground was supplemented with the Veckholm proving ground. The detachment on Gotland was using Hällarna in Visby and Tofta proving ground.

Heraldry and traditions

Colours, standards and guidons
On 16 September 1945, the regiment was presented with two colour by the acting military commander of the IV Military Area, major general Arvid Moberg. The colours had previously been presented by the 1st and 2nd Battalions at Göta Life Guards (I 2), who received the colours by His Majesty the King Oscar II on 6 August 1894. The colours themselves had been paid personally by Oscar II, and were presented by the regiment until it was disbanded in 1939. In 1972, a new colour was presented, which was handed over on 11 May 1974 by His Majesty the King Carl XVI Gustaf. The new colour replaced the two previous ones. At the disbandment of the regiment in 1980, the colour was handed over to the Swedish Army Museum.

Uniforms
The regiment differed in clothing compared to other armoured units, wearing black beret for uniform m/60. The Göta Life Guards instead carried side cap with red collar to uniform m/60. Buttons, branch insignias and rank insignia were in silver. On peaked caps rank insignias in silver was worn and with collar in silver. That the regiment's insignias was in silver, was to mark that it was a guards unit.

Coat of arms
The coat of the arms of the Göta Life Guards (P 1) 1977–1980. Blazon: "Azure, the lesser coat of arms of Sweden, three open crowns or. The shield surmounted two arms in fess, embowed and vambraced, the hands holding swords in saltire, argent".

Heritage
When the regiment was disbanded, the Chief of the Army, lieutenant general Nils Sköld decided, on the recommendation of executive officer Sven Björck, that no other unit or regiment would carry on the traditions of the Göta Life Guards but that the memory of the regiment should be preserved at Uppland Regiment (S 1/Fo 47/48). Since 1 January 2006, this memory has been passed on to the Command and Control Regiment.

Commanding officers

Regimental commanders and executive officers (Sekundchef) active at the regiment. Sekundchef was a title which was used until 31 December 1974 at the regiments that were part of the King's Life and Household Troops (Kungl. Maj:ts Liv- och Hustrupper).

Regimental commanders
1944–1950: Gustaf V
1950–1973: Gustaf VI Adolf
1973–1974: Carl XVI Gustaf
1975–1980: Sven G:son Björck

Executive officers
1944–1951: Nils Gustaf D:son Aschan
1951–1955: Fale Burman
1955–1966: Åke Wikland
1966–1973: Nils Östlund
1973–1974: Sven G:son Björck

Names, designations and locations

See also
 List of Swedish armoured regiments

Footnotes

References

Notes

Print

Further reading

Armored regiments of the Swedish Army
Disbanded units and formations of Sweden
Military units and formations established in 1944
Military units and formations disestablished in 1980
Former guards regiments
1944 establishments in Sweden
1980 disestablishments in Sweden
Enköping Garrison